The Clarence Keating House is a house located near Jerome, Idaho, in the United States, that was listed on the National Register of Historic Places in 1983.

It was built in 1917 by master stonemason H.T. Pugh. It includes Colonial Revival architecture.

See also

 List of National Historic Landmarks in Idaho
 National Register of Historic Places listings in Jerome County, Idaho

References

Colonial Revival architecture in Idaho
Houses completed in 1917
Houses in Jerome County, Idaho
Houses on the National Register of Historic Places in Idaho
National Register of Historic Places in Jerome County, Idaho